Slamma Jamma is a 2017 American faith-based-themed sports drama film written and directed by Timothy A. Chey.

Premise
Once promising college basketball player Michael Diggs (Chris Staples) is released from prison after serving six years in prison for armed robbery and wins the national slam dunk competition against all odds.

Cast
 Chris Staples as Michael Diggs
 Michael Irvin as Terrell
 Jose Canseco as Jose Canseco
 Kenny Dobbs as Kenny Dobbs
 Ryan Gunnarson as Jerome Matthews
 Ray Walia as Pastor John Soul
 Michael Hardy as Brandon
 Aqueela Zoll as Linda Collins
 Kelsey Caesar as Taye
 Gary Smith as Craig Jackson
 Kay Wallia as Melinda Jones
 Charles Hoyes as Mark Jacobs
 Rosemarie Smith-Coleman as Gemma
 Tammy Brawner as Tammy Goodwin
 Michael Cognata as Lizare
 William Thomas Jones as Warden Ed Williams
 Justin Darlington as Jammer
 Aaron Braxton as Red

Reception

Box office
Slamma Jamma grossed $1,687,000 in 502 theaters in its opening weekend

Critical response
Slamma Jamma received both positive and negative reviews.

In a review for Focus on the Family, the film critic wrote, "Slamma Jamma has a good heart and fine messages. But perhaps more importantly for those who want to see the film, it showcases some amazing athleticism. While this basketball film sometimes stumbles a bit narratively and content-wise, on the court its slam dunk maestros literally soar."

In a review for MovieGuide, the film critic wrote, "SLAMMA JAMMA is an uplifting, positive movie with strong Christian faith and values. It calls on people to choose God’s love and turn to faith to overcome the world’s troubles."

In a review for The Hollywood Reporter, Frank Scheck wrote that the film combined its "inspirational and sports-movie tropes in hackneyed, unoriginal fashion" and it's "hoary, melodramatic plotting and painfully awkward dialogue leave nary a cliché untouched."

A review on Common Sense Media gave it one out of five stars stressing that "[u]nless you're a fan of the physical act of the slam dunk (of which there are plenty in this film), there's nothing to recommend in this artless redemption story. Slamma Jamma has a decent message -- hanging onto faith and fortitude is a decisive way to rise from the ashes of youthful 'mistakes' -- but the film itself is weighed down by so many missed opportunities that it's hard to watch."

Bad movie podcast The Flop House unanimously gave the film a "Good-Bad" rating indicating that while the movie is lacking in many regards, its shortcomings make it entertaining in a "so bad it's good" kind of way.

References

External links
 
 

2017 films
2017 independent films
2010s sports drama films
American basketball films
American sports drama films
American independent films
Films about Christianity
Films directed by Timothy A. Chey
Films set in Los Angeles
Films shot in Los Angeles
2017 drama films
2010s English-language films
2010s American films